Mahek Chahal (born 1 February 1979) is a Norwegian actress and model who works in Hindi films and television. She began her acting career in 2002 with Telugu film Neetho and later made her Hindi debut with Nayee Padosan in 2003. She was also seen in several songs appearances for Hindi, Telugu, Punjabi and Tamil films. In 2011, Chahal participated in Colors TV reality show Bigg Boss 5 and emerged as the runner-up.
 
In 2021, she participated in stunt-based reality show Khatron Ke Khiladi 11. Chahal is best known for portraying the role of Naagin Mahek in Colors TV's supernatural franchise Naagin 6.

Career

Early work ( 2002–2011) 
She made her film debut in 2002 with the Telugu film Neetho playing Shalini and later made Hindi debut with romantic-comedy
Nayee Padosan playing Pooja Iyengar (A south Indian girl) the film was a moderate success at the box office. She also did item number in the film Chameli (2004). Chahal next performed in a Punjabi movie Dil Apna Punjabi playing Lisa Kaur. 

In 2008, she was seen in supporting roles in Hindi films Wanted playing Shaina and Main Aurr Mrs Khanna playing Tia Roberts. She did several appearances in Tamil, Telugu and Hindi films. Chahal made her television debut with C.I.D. in 2009.

Bigg Boss and more (2011–2018) 
In 2011, she was participated in Colors TV's reality show Bigg Boss in its 5th season where she survived fifteen weeks and emerged as the runner-up. Chahal was also featured in Norwegian reality show Fristet in same year.
 
She then did an item number in the comedy film Yamla Pagla Deewana (2011). She also starred in Karar: The Deal (2014). Chahal launched her clothing line Mahek Chahal clothing in Norway. She was again appeared in Colors TV's reality show Bigg Boss Halla Bol in 2015 where she came as a Challenger she stayed there three weeks until got evicted by facing public votes.

Chahal was also seen as contestant in Power couple along with Ashmit Patel. She then did item number in Tamil film Gethu and later appeared as guest in comedy show Comedy Nights Bachao. 

In 2016, she was seen portraying Manjulika an antagonist in Colors TV's supernatural thriller Kavach. In 2018 she was appererad in Hindi film Nirdosh. It was reported that she would appear as the dancer in Ek Thi Rani Ek Tha Raavan, but Sara Khan was cast for the cameo appearance.

Television comeback 2021–present 
She was seen as contestant in stunt-based reality show Fear Factor: Khatron Ke Khiladi 11 which is film in Cape Town, South Africa where she finished at 11th place.

Recently, she was seen portraying Shesh Naagin Mahek Gujral the antagonist in Ekta Kapoor's popular supernatural thriller franchise Naagin 6 on Colors TV.

Filmography

Films

As dancer

Television

Special appearances

See also 
 List of Hindi film actresses

References

External links 

 
 

Living people
1979 births
Actresses from Oslo
Models from Oslo
Norwegian film actresses
Norwegian television actresses
Norwegian female models
Punjabi people
Norwegian people of Punjabi descent
Norwegian people of Indian descent
Actresses in Telugu cinema
Actresses in Hindi cinema
Actresses in Punjabi cinema
Actresses in Bengali cinema
Actresses in Kannada cinema
Actresses in Tamil cinema
Actresses in Hindi television
Actresses of Indian descent
Norwegian expatriates in India
European actresses in India
Bigg Boss (Hindi TV series) contestants
Fear Factor: Khatron Ke Khiladi participants
21st-century Norwegian actresses